Graham Jacobs (born 22 November 1940) is  a former Australian rules footballer who played for Richmond in the Victorian Football League (VFL).

Notes

External links 
		

Living people
1940 births
Australian rules footballers from Victoria (Australia)
Richmond Football Club players